Eryn may refer to:

Eryn Bulmer (born 1976), female diver and gold medallist from Canada
Eryn Green, American poet, winner of the Yale Series of Younger Poets Competition
Eryn Allen Kane, American rhythm and blues musician from Detroit, Michigan
Eryn Krueger Mekash, American make-up artist, producer and special effects artist
Eryn Reece, American bartender, bar director for Banzabar and Freemans Restaurant in New York City
Eryn Shewell (born 1984), American jazz and blues guitarist and vocalist from Jackson, New Jersey

See also
Eryn also means "forest" in the fictional language Sindarin devised by J. R. R. Tolkien, giving rise to:
Eryn Lasgalen, renaming of the fictional forest "Mirkwood" in J. R. R. Tolkien's Middle Earth after its cleansing by Galadriel
Eryn Vorn, fictional ancient woodland in J. R. R. Tolkien's Middle Earth